The Kanchanaphisek Bridge is a cable stayed bridge crossing the Chao Phraya river in Samut Prakan Province, Thailand. It is part of the Outer Ring Road encircling Bangkok. The bridge was opened to traffic on 15 November 2007 and has a main span of 500 meters. The name of the bridge comes from the Thai word for the ceremony celebrating the 50th anniversary of the accession of King Bhumibol Adulyadej. The bridge is 52 meters above sea level to allow cargo vessels to enter and exit. The bridge is the first bridge in Samut Prakan Province across over the Chao Phraya River that connect Phra Pradaeng District on the east and west side.

The bridge was designed by Parsons Brinckerhoff. The bridge is part of the Outer Ring Road network, There is a toll for its use.

Gallery

External links

References 

Cable-stayed bridges in Thailand
Bridges completed in 2007
Crossings of the Chao Phraya River
Toll bridges